The Chatham Standard Time Zone is a geographic region that keeps time by adding twelve hours and forty-five minutes to Coordinated Universal Time (UTC) resulting in UTC+12:45.

The Chatham Standard Time Zone is used exclusively in the Chatham Islands, New Zealand, located in the South Pacific Ocean at 43°53′54″S, 176°31′44″W.

It is one of only three time zones with a 45-minute offset from UTC, the others being Nepal Standard Time (UTC+05:45) and the unofficial Australian Central Western Time (UTC+08:45).

During summer daylight saving time is observed and clocks are advanced one hour. Chatham Daylight Time  (CHADT) is 13 hours 45 minutes ahead of UTC, 45 minutes ahead of New Zealand Daylight Time (NZDT). Currently daylight saving time runs from the last Sunday in September at 2:45 to the first Sunday in April at 3:45

Legislation
Time in the Chatham Islands is legislated as being 45 minutes ahead of New Zealand time by sections 3 and 4 of the Time Act 1974 (1974 no 39).

References

External links
 Current local time in The Chatham Islands from timeanddate.com

Time zones
Chatham Islands
Time in New Zealand